The Cangin languages  are spoken by 200,000 people (as of 2007) in a small area east of Dakar, Senegal. They are the languages spoken by the Serer people who do not speak the Serer language (Serer-Sine). Because the people are ethnically Serer, the Cangin languages are commonly thought to be dialects of the Serer language. However, they are not closely related; Serer is closer to Fulani than it is to Cangin.

Languages
The Cangin languages are:

Lehar and Noon are particularly close, as are Ndut and Palor, though not quite to the point of easy intelligibility. Safen is transparently closer to Lehar–Noon than to Palor–Ndut.

Reconstruction
Merrill (2018: 451) reconstructs Proto-Cangin as follows.

See also
Serer language
List of Proto-Cangin reconstructions (Wiktionary)

Footnotes

References
Walter Pichl, The Cangin Group: A Language Group in Northern Senegal, Pittsburgh, PA : Institute of African Affairs, Duquesne University, Coll. African Reprint Series, 1966, vol. 20
Guillaume Segerer & Florian Lionnet 2010. "'Isolates' in 'Atlantic'". Language Isolates in Africa workshop, Lyon, Dec. 4

 
Languages of Senegal
Languages of the Gambia
Languages of Mauritania